Nicholas Taylor and David Wagner defeated Sarah Hunter and Peter Norfolk in the final, 5–7, 6–0, [10–3] to win the inaugural quad doubles wheelchair tennis title at the 2008 Australian Open.

Seeds

  Nicholas Taylor /  David Wagner (champions)
  Sarah Hunter /  Peter Norfolk (finals)

Draw

Finals

External links 
 Australian Open – Wheelchair Quad Doubles Scores

Wheelchair Quad Doubles
2008 Quad Doubles